Micrathena schreibersi, also known by its common name Amazon thorn spider, is a species from the genus Micrathena.

References

Araneidae
Spiders described in 1833